Van Neste or Vanneste is a surname. Notable people with the surname include:

Carlo Van Neste (1914–1992), Belgian violinist
Christian Vanneste (born 1947), French politician
Jacques Vanneste, UK-based mathematician
Willy Van Neste (born 1944), Belgian cyclist

Surnames of Dutch origin